Mary Jo Keenen is an American former television actress.

Career
She had regular roles as Nurse Julie Milbury on the Empty Nest spin-off Nurses, Gloria Elgis on City with Valerie Harper, and  Stephanie James on My Wildest Dreams.  She also guest-starred on series including Search for Tomorrow, Broken Badges, The Commish, The John Larroquette Show and Seinfeld. Her most recent TV role was on Everybody Loves Raymond in 1999.

Personal life
She has been married to writer and producer Mitchell Hurwitz since 1999. They have two daughters: May Asami, born in 2000, and Phoebe Hitomi born in 2002.

References

External links

American television actresses
Living people
Actresses from New Jersey
20th-century American actresses
Year of birth missing (living people)
People from Westfield, New Jersey